Howe Sounds/Taking Abalonia is a re-release of Said the Whale's debut album Taking Abalonia along with seven new songs. The album was re-released on June 3, 2008 in Canada and soon after on iTunes.

Track listing 
All songs written by Bancroft and Worcester.

Personnel 
On Howe Sounds (Tracks 1-7):
Ben Worcester - guitar, vocals
Tyler Bancroft - guitar, vocals
Jeff LaForge - bass, vocals
Spencer Schoening - drums
Laura Smith - keyboards

On Taking Abalonia (Tracks 8-15):
Ben Worcester - guitar, vocals
Tyler Bancroft - guitar, vocals
Aidan Rantoul - bass
Carey Pratt - drums
Tom Dobranski - piano

References

External links 
Said The Whale Official website

2008 albums
Said the Whale albums
Reissue albums